Gerald William Nichols (born February 10, 1964) is a former American football defensive lineman in the National Football League for the New York Jets, Tampa Bay Buccaneers, Philadelphia Eagles, and the Washington Redskins.  He played college football at Florida State University and was drafted in the seventh round of the 1987 NFL Draft. He lives in Sarasota, Florida and is retired from the National Football League.

References

1964 births
Living people
Players of American football from St. Louis
American football defensive tackles
New York Jets players
Tampa Bay Buccaneers players
Philadelphia Eagles players
Washington Redskins players
Florida State Seminoles football players